This is a list of women artists who were born in Serbia or whose artworks are closely associated with that country.

B
Ana Bešlić (1912–2008), sculptor
Kossa Bokchan (1925–2009), painter

C
Zuzana Chalupová (1925–2001), naïve painter

D
Jasmina Đokić (born 1970), painter

I
Tatjana Ilić (born 1966), painter
Mirjana Isaković, sculptor and ceramist
Olja Ivanjicki (1931–2009), contemporary artist
Katarina Ivanović (1811–1882), painter

J
Olga Jančić (1929–2012), sculptor
Olga Jevrić (1922–2014), sculptor
Ljubinka Jovanović (1922–2015), painter

K
Mina Karadžić (1828–1894), painter
Irena Kazazić (born 1972), painter

O
Tanja Ostojić (born 1972), feminist performance artist

P
Milena Pavlović-Barili (1909–1945), painter
Nadežda Petrović (1873–1915), painter
Zora Petrović (1894–1962), painter

R
Simonida Rajčević (born 1974), painter
Drinka Radovanović (born 1943), sculptor
Eva Ras (born 1941), actress, writer, painter

S
Ljubica Sokić (1914–2009), painter
Jovanka Stanojević (born 1979), painter
Slobodanka Stupar (born 1947), visual artist

T
Milica Tomić (born 1960), contemporary artist

V
Draginja Vlasic (1928–2011), painter 
Beta Vukanović (1872–1972), painter

-
Serbian
Artists, women artists
Artists